Marion Leonard (June 9, 1881 – January 9, 1956) was an American stage actress who became one of the first motion picture celebrities in the early years of the silent film era.

Early career
Born in Cincinnati, Ohio, Marion Leonard began her acting career in live theatre, but at the age of 27 she started performing in the rapidly expanding film industry. She signed a contract in 1908 with the American Mutoscope and Biograph Company and initially worked at that studio's production facilities in New York City, which were then located at 11 East, 14th Street in Manhattan. There she made her screen debut in At the Crossroads of Life, a short directed by Wallace McCutcheon, Jr. and written by D. W. Griffith, who also acted in that film and directed the vast majority of Leonard's other films at Biograph. 

Shortly after her screen debut, Leonard became one of the company's leading "photoplayers". At a time when screen credits were not given to actors, she and Florence Auer were the first star actresses to be billed by the studio as a "Biograph Girl". Among the many films Leonard made at Biograph, 32 of them were with an up-and-coming young actress named Mary Pickford.

Marriage and switch to Universal Pictures

While working for Biograph, Leonard met screenwriter/director Stanner E.V. Taylor and a personal relationship developed that led to marriage. They created their own studio, the Gem Motion Picture Company, in 1911 to benefit from Leonard's increasing popularity.

In 1915, after appearing in more than 150 motion pictures, Leonard retired from film acting. She returned, however, 11 years later at age 45 for one final screen appearance in a 1926 Mack Sennett comedy.

Leonard died in 1956 at the Motion Picture & Television Country House and Hospital in Woodland Hills, California.

Selected filmography

References

External links

 
Marion Leonard at Women Film Pioneers Project

1881 births
1956 deaths
American stage actresses
American film actresses
American silent film actresses
Actresses from Ohio
20th-century American actresses
Women film pioneers